Jonathan Mercier (born February 18, 1986) is a Swiss former professional ice hockey defenseman who spent all of his career with Genève-Servette HC of the National League (NL).

Playing career
Mercier made his National League debut playing with Genève-Servette HC during the 2003–04 NL season.

On January 20, 2014, Mercier was signed to a three-year contract extension by Genève-Servette. Mercier won the 2014 and 2015 Spengler Cup with Geneva.

On May 17, 2016, Mercier agreed to a two-year contract extension with Geneva. During the 2016–17 season, Mercier played his 542nd regular season game with Geneva in the NL, becoming the all-time leader in term of games played for Genève-Servette.

On December 28, 2018, Mercier signed an early two-year contract extension with the team through the 2020/21 season. On January 16, 2021, Mercier was suspended for 7 games and fined CHF 5,700 after he accidentally bumped into a referee in a game against HC Ambrì-Piotta on January 12, 2021. Servette appealed the decision and both the suspension and the fine were eventually reduced to 3 games and CHF 2,520 on January 21, 2021.

On April 6, 2021, Merci was signed to an early one-year contract extension by Servette through the 2021/22 season.

Mercier retired from professional hockey following the 2021–22 season.

International play
Mercier was named to Switzerland's under-18 team for the 2004 IIHF World U18 Championship Division I in Austria. He scored 1 goal to help Switzerland win the tournament and earn a promotion to the top division for the 2005 edition.

Mercier played 4 exhibition games with Switzerland men's team, never participating in any World Championships nor Olympic Games.

Personal life
His father Alain Mercier also played professional hockey with Genève-Servette HC from 1985 to 1991. He appeared in 98 Swiss League games and was also a defenseman.

Career statistics

Regular season and playoffs

International

References

External links

1986 births
Living people
Genève-Servette HC players
Swiss ice hockey defencemen
EHC Visp players
Ice hockey people from Geneva